Party Wire is a 1935 drama film starring Jean Arthur and Victor Jory. It was based on the novel of the same name by Bruce Manning. In a small town, an overheard conversation on a telephone party line results in gossip that causes a great deal of trouble for a young woman and a wealthy man.


Plot
Matthew Putnam (Victor Jory) is summoned back to his small hometown of Rockridge by his aged, bedridden aunt Nettie (Helen Lowell) after seven years of enjoying himself in Europe, where he had been sent to study. She is tired and wants him to take charge of Putnam Dairies, the family business and the town's major employer. Every mother with a marriageable daughter is excited by the return of the wealthy young man, including Mathilda Sherman (Clara Blandick). However, Matthew shows no interest in Mathilda's daughter Irene (Geneva Mitchell).

When Matthew visits his good friend Will Oliver (Charley Grapewin), he is pleasantly surprised to see how grown up and beautiful Will's daughter Marge (Jean Arthur) has become. His reluctance to remain in town evaporates as he spends more and more time with herflirting with her at the bank where she works.

This does not sit well with Roy Daniels (Robert Allen). When Roy makes his bid for her affections, she turns him down, so he decides to leave for New York City the next day. Marge is up late at night trying to balance the church's finances, for which she and Roy are responsible. Finally, an irate Will calls over the shared telephone line (a "party line") and leaves an angry message for Roy to come over to straighten out the mess before he leaves town. However, telephone eavesdroppers misinterpret the message and assume that Roy has gotten Marge pregnant and is trying to leave town without marrying her.

Mathilda is delighted at the ostensible scandal and bullies her husband Tom (Oscar Apfel), the president of the Sherman Bank, into firing Marge. She also disqualifies Marge's winning entry in the prestigious annual flower show. Marge and Matthew are oblivious to the rumors. He asks her to marry him; she accepts, provided they elope the next day. When Matthew is late for their elopement, Marge assumes he believes the stories. Will, having discovered it was his call that started the whole mess, shoots himself, but botches his suicide and survives with only a minor head wound.

Marge and Mathew separately find out about the ugly stories being circulated about Marge. Matthew decides to teach the town a sharp lesson. He first transfers all his money out of the Sherman Bank, which would lead to its collapse, and orders the replacement of all 300 local workers with out-of-towners. Faced with the destruction of their community, the workers organize a meeting that Matthew attends in the new town hall. Before things get totally out of hand, Matthew's aunt Nettiewho hadn't left bed the last fifteen yearsshows up and gives the townsfolk a tongue-lashing for their malicious gossip by bringing up their own past misdeeds.

Everything is eventually straightened out and the couple sneak off to the nearby town Springfield to get married. However, the chastened townspeople have not changed their ways. A mock disagreement between the newlyweds about where they should spend their honeymoon is seen and misreported as a full-blown argument by Bert West.

Cast
Jean Arthur as Marge Oliver
Victor Jory as Matthew Putnam
Helen Lowell as Nettie Putnam
Robert Allen as Roy Daniels
Charley Grapewin as Will Oliver
Clara Blandick as Mathilda Sherman
Geneva Mitchell as Irene Sherman
Maude Eburne as Clara West
Matt McHugh as Bert West
Oscar Apfel as Tom Sherman
Robert Middlemass as Judge Steven Stephenson
Walter Brennan as Paul, Telegraph Operator (uncredited)
Louise Carter as Grandma Kern (uncredited)

External links
 
 

1935 films
American romantic drama films
American black-and-white films
Columbia Pictures films
Films based on American novels
Films directed by Erle C. Kenton
1935 romantic drama films
1930s American films